Deuterocopus melanota is a moth of the family Pterophoridae. It was described by Thomas Bainbrigge Fletcher in 1910 and it is found in Malaysia and Sri Lanka.

References

Moths described in 1910
Deuterocopinae